The 2012–13 season of Majstrovstvá regiónu is the twentieth season of the fourth-tier football league in Slovakia, since its establishment in 1993.

64 teams are geographically divided into four groups: Majstrovstvá regiónu Bratislava, Majstrovstvá regiónu Západ, Majstrovstvá regiónu Stred and Majstrovstvá regiónu Východ (16 teams each). Teams are playing against teams in their own division only.

Majstrovstvá regiónu Bratislava

Team changes from 2011–12
Promoted in 3. liga: ↑LP Domino↑
Relegated from 3. liga: None.
Promoted in Majstrovstvá regiónu: ↑Inter Bratislava↑, ↑FC Rohožník↑
Relegated from Majstrovstvá regiónu: ↓Iskra Petržalka↓

Locations

League table

Majstrovstvá regiónu Západ

Team changes from 2011–12
Promoted in 3. liga: ↑Piešťany↑, ↑Levice↑
Relegated from 3. liga: None.
Promoted in Majstrovstvá regiónu: ↑Lednické Rovne↑, ↑Neded↑,  ↑Beluša↑
Relegated from Majstrovstvá regiónu: ↓Dunajská Streda B↓

Locations

League table

Majstrovstvá regiónu Stred

Team changes from 2011–12
Promoted in 3. liga: ↑Martin↑
Relegated from 3. liga: ↓Zvolen↓
Promoted in Majstrovstvá regiónu: ↑Bytča↑, ↑Brusno↑, ↑Dolná Tižina↑
Relegated from Majstrovstvá regiónu: ↓Turany↓, ↓Lietavská Lúčka↓

Locations

League table

Majstrovstvá regiónu Východ

Team changes from 2011–12
Promoted in 3. liga: ↑1. HFC Humenné↑
Relegated from 3. liga: ↓Stará Ľubovňa↓
Promoted in Majstrovstvá regiónu: ↑Vysoké Tatry↑, ↑Veľké Revištia↑
Relegated from Majstrovstvá regiónu: ↓Nižný Hrušov↓

Locations

League table

References

External links
 BFZ official site 
 ZSFZ official site 
 SSFZ official site 
 VSFZ official site 

4
4
Slovak
4. Liga (Slovakia) seasons